Bon Air is the name of multiple municipalities and places in the United States:

Bon Air, Alabama
Bon Air, Sumner County, Tennessee
Bon Air, White County, Tennessee
Bon Air, Virginia
Bon Air, Louisville, Kentucky
Bon Air (Pittsburgh), Pennsylvania
 Bon Air (Fallston, Maryland), listed on the NRHP in Maryland
 Bon Air (Elkton, Virginia), listed on the NRHP in Virginia
Bon Air (PAT station)
Bon Air (Tampa), a neighborhood within the City of Tampa, Florida

See also
Bon Aire
Bonaire